Travis Colter (born October 15, 1991) is a Canadian curler from Dartmouth, Nova Scotia. He was a member of the 2019 Nova Scotia men's championship rink that competed at the 2019 Tim Hortons Brier, Canada's national men's curling championship.

Career

Men's
Colter began curling at around 2007. By 2010, he had already joined up with former Brier champion Mark Dacey, playing lead on his team. He played in his first provincial championship at the 2011 Nova Scotia Men's Molson Provincial Championship. There, the team lost in the C qualifier final. The next season, they lost in the final of the 2012 Nova Scotia Men's Molson Provincial Championship to the Jamie Murphy rink. In 2012, Colter joined the Kevin Saccary rink, and joined the Tommy Sullivan rink in 2014. The Sullivan rink went 2–5 at the 2015 provincial championship.

In 2015, Colter joined the Stuart Thompson rink as the team's second. Team found immediate success on the World Curling Tour, winning two events in 2015, the Bud Light Men's Cashspiel  and the Spitfire Arms Cash Spiel.  The team played in the 2016 provincial championships, finishing fourth with a 4–3 record.

Team Thompson began the 2016–17 season by winning the Lakeshore Curling Club Cashspiel. Two months later, the team won the Challenge Casino de Charlevoix event. At the 2017 Deloitte Tankard provincial championship, the rink finished the round robin with a 5–2 record, which put the team into the playoffs. They won their semifinal match, but lost in the final to Jamie Murphy. At the 2018 Deloitte Tankard, they went 4–3 in the round robin, putting them in a three-way tiebreaker. They won both their tiebreak matches, but lost in the semifinal to Colter's former skip, Mark Dacey.

The Thompson rink began the 2018–19 season by winning the 2018 Curling Store Cashspiel tour event. Later that season, the team won the 2019 Deloitte Tankard in Dartmouth, Nova Scotia qualifying them for the 2019 Tim Hortons Brier in Brandon, Manitoba for the first time. At the Brier, as Team Nova Scotia, the team finished with a 3–4 record in pool play. The next season, Colter moved to play lead on the team. The team won a second straight Curling Store Cashspiel in 2019 At the 2020 Deloitte Tankard, the team finished the round robin with a 4–3 record, and then lost in a tiebreaker match to Chad Stevens.

Colter formed his own rink in 2020 as a skip, but throwing third stones with teammates Robby McLean, Ian Juurlink and Cameron MacKenzie. The team won their first event together, the 2020 Curling Store Cashspiel, the third straight title for Colter.

Mixed doubles
Colter and partner Julia Williams won the 2014 provincial mixed doubles curling championship. The pair represented Nova Scotia at the 2014 Canadian Mixed Doubles Curling Trials where they finished with a 1–6 record.

Personal life
As of 2019, Colter was employed as a project quotation specialist for Graybar Canada. He is married.

References

External links

1991 births
Curlers from Nova Scotia
Sportspeople from Halifax, Nova Scotia
Sportspeople from Dartmouth, Nova Scotia
Canadian male curlers
Living people